The Texas Football League (TFL) was a low-level American football minor league that operated in primarily in the United States from 1966 through 1968, and again between 1970 and 1971 as a new incarnation called the Trans-American Football League (TAFL).

The 1971 season of the TAFL was the first season of spring pro football in United States, which made it the first spring pro football league.

History
The league, which initially comprised six franchises from Texas and Oklahoma, was formally announced in May 1966. The league was supposed to begin with eight teams, but entries from Hammond, Louisiana and New Orleans were not accepted. With the addition of two franchises in 1967, the TFL expanded to two four-team divisions.

During the 1967-68 offseason the Continental Football League offered a merger of operations with the TFL, but was turned down by TFL commissioner George Schepps. He additionally challenged the CoFL to pit its champion against the TFL's champion for the 1968 campaign.

On January 25, 1969, it was announced that the Continental Football League was adding the entirety of the eight-team TFL to its ranks. The TFL joined as a separate entity and was placed into the new Texas Division (itself split into East and West). The TFL teams were mostly scheduled to play against each other but did also play interleague contests. Joining the Texas division was the Mexico Golden Aztecs, the first American football franchise based in Mexico. The TFL's San Antonio Toros defeated the Indianapolis Capitols, 44-38 in overtime, to capture the last Continental League championship. (The Toros would ultimately win five straight league titles from 1967-71.)

1966 
W = Wins, L = Losses, T = Ties, PCT= Winning Percentage, PF= Points For, PA = Points Against

 = Division Champion

1967 
W = Wins, L = Losses, T = Ties, PCT= Winning Percentage, PF= Points For, PA = Points Against

 = Division Champion

1968 
W = Wins, L = Losses, T = Ties, PCT= Winning Percentage, PF= Points For, PA = Points Against

 = Division Champion

Trans-American Football League
With the dissolution of the CoFL in early 1970, the Toros announced the formation of the Trans-American Football League, hoping to add teams in a number of major markets; the TAFL planned teams in Birmingham; Tampa; Hershey, Pennsylvania and even Los Angeles, in addition to San Antonio and existing Continental teams in Chicago, Dallas-Fort Worth and Memphis (relocated from Las Vegas). By the time the league played its 1970 season, it was once again mainly based in Texas, with two other Continental teams, the Omaha Mustangs and Texarkana Titans, joining the loop.

In 1971, the Trans-American Football League took the unusual step of becoming the first football league to schedule and play all of its games in the spring rather than the autumn, a move that attracted the attention of Sports Illustrated pro football columnist Tex Maule. The 1971 TAFL season ran from April 25 to June 26  
. Although Maule commented that the Trans-American league's four teams' Fort Worth to San Antonio lineup "barely makes it Trans-Texas", he also noted that "This is the first bona fide attempt to play spring football," a gimmick that the United States Football League did on a larger scale a decade later.

On the other hand, attendance for the four teams "reached a new low" and, as sports historian Bob Gill would note in 2002, "it was clear by mid-June that the concept of spring football was dead -- and probably the Texas League along with it". The TAFL folded after its spring 1971 season.

1970 
W = Wins, L = Losses, T = Ties, PCT= Winning Percentage, PF= Points For, PA = Points Against

 = Division Champion

1971 
W = Wins, L = Losses, T = Ties, PCT= Winning Percentage, PF= Points For, PA = Points Against

 = Division Champion

Championship games

Southwest Professional Football League
After the collapse of the Trans-American Football League the two bigger teams—the San Antonio Toros and the Dallas Rockets—formed a new league called the Southwest Professional Football League (SWPFL), and moved the season back to the fall. The league commissioner was Pro Football Hall of Famer Ollie Matson, but the SWPFL operated on a much smaller budget than previous related leagues, and disbanded after only two seasons.

1972

1973 

After the first season the SWPFL approached to the Canadian Football League to become an "American branch league of the CFL". The league even sent representative to the CFL league meeting, which were "receptive to the idea", but the SWPFL did not survive long enough to see it come to fruition.

Semifinals:San Antonio Toros 45 vs. Las Vegas Casinos 3

Finals:Oklahoma City Wranglers 19 vs. San Antonio Toros 16

Aftermath 
The Toros continued to exist into 1974 season and joined the semi-pro Mid-America Football League, and even playing an exhibition game against the Houston Oilers on July 16. Because of a players' strike, the Oilers played with an all-rookie roster, narrowly defeating the Toros 13–7 in a much more competitive match than most NFL vs. non-NFL matches were at the time.

See also
 List of leagues of American football

References 

Defunct American football leagues in the United States
Sports leagues established in 1966
Sports leagues disestablished in 1971